Moksha is a concept in Indian religions.

Moksha may also refer to:
 Mokshas, an ethnic group of European Russia
 Moksha language, a Uralic language
 Moksha (2001 film), a Bollywood film
 Moksha (2011 film), a Telugu-language film
 Moksha (festival), Netaji Subhas University of Technology, New Delhi, India
 Moksha (Jainism), a Sanskrit or Prakrit term meaning liberation, salvation or emancipation of soul
 Moksha Records, an English electronic music record company
 Moksha (river), Russia
 moksha (with lower-case "m", also called "Jehannum"), a character in Stephen R. Donaldson's The Chronicles of Thomas Covenant, the Unbeliever
 Moksha, a fictional drug in Aldous Huxley's Island
 Moksha, a computer desktop environment

See also
 Mokshan, an urban-type settlement in Penza Oblast, Russia